Bahrain Mumtalakat Holding Company (Mumtalakat) is the sovereign wealth fund of the Kingdom of Bahrain. It was established by Royal Decree in 2006 and is wholly owned by the Government. Mumtalakat actively sought investment opportunities locally, regionally and internationally.

In 2022, according to the Sovereign Wealth Fund Institute, the fund has nearly $18 billion in assets under management.

Mumtalakat invests in assets unrelated to either oil or gas across different sectors including education, aviation, healthcare, consumer and financial services, industrial manufacturing, real estate, tourism and logistics. From its inception in 2006, Mumtalakat initially pursued investments primarily in Bahrain, with just 3% apportioned abroad; in 2019, that figure rose to 30%, comprising investments in Europe, the United States, the Middle East and North Africa consisting of both minority and majority stakes in its portfolio companies. Mumtalakat Holding Company B.S.C. is based in the Arcapita Building, Bahrain Bay, Bahrain.

Investments
Since 2018 Mumtalakat owns 56% of McLaren Group.

Mumtalakat is also a shareholder in: 
Aluminium Bahrain
Bahrain Real Estate Investment Company
Bahrain Telecommunications Company (36,7%)
Envirogen Group (British group specialized in industrial water treatment solutions)
FAI Aviation Group (German private jet rental company)
Gulf Cryo (first Kuwaiti gas manufacturer in industrial gases such as oxygen and nitrogen to the petroleum industry)
Gulf Hotel Group (Bahraini hotels chain)
National Bank of Bahrain
Premo Group (German group specialized in the development, manufacture and sale of electronic components)

References

External links

 

Politics of Bahrain
Economy of Bahrain
Investment promotion agencies
Companies of Bahrain
Sovereign wealth funds